Vestlands-Posten (or Vestlandsposten) was a newspaper published in Stavanger, Norway from 1878 to 1916. 

Vestlands-Posten was founded by Lars Oftedal, a leading politician in the Liberal Party and later the Moderate Liberal Party, who was also a pastor and later a leader in a lay preaching movement. Hartvig Halvorsen was the newspaper's founding editor. Publishing three issues per week, Vestlands-Posten expanded rapidly and in the 1880s was the Norwegian newspaper with the largest readership outside Oslo (Christiania), the capital. Vestlands-Posten became the influential organ for Agrarian Liberals (Bonde-Venstre) and Liberal Party politics, later the Moderate Liberal Party.

External links
 Den Stavangerske presse, 1814-1914, including Vestlands-Posten (Norwegian)

1878 establishments in Norway
1916 disestablishments in Norway
Defunct newspapers published in Norway
Mass media in Stavanger
Moderate Liberal Party
Norwegian-language newspapers
Publications established in 1878
Publications disestablished in 1916